Dennis Alan Cardoza  (born March 31, 1959) is an American politician who served as the U.S. representative for  from 2003 to 2012. The district took in a large swath of the Central Valley, from Stockton to Fresno. He is a member of the Democratic Party. On October 20, 2011, he announced he would retire from Congress at the end of 2012.

He first won election to Congress after defeating Congressman Gary Condit in the March 2002 Democratic Party primary election.

He resigned from Congress effective August 14, 2012, citing family concerns as a priority, and joined the law firm Foley & Lardner LLP in a public affairs and lobbying role.

Early life
Cardoza was born in Merced, California, of Portuguese ancestry. He grew up in Atwater, California, and graduated from Atwater High School. He was educated at the California State University, Stanislaus in Turlock, California, then transferred to University of Maryland, College Park. He is a member of Theta Chi fraternity.

Political career
Cardoza's interest in public service began in college when he interned on Capitol Hill during the summer of 1979. The first in his family to graduate from college, Cardoza went on to run a successful small business. Cardoza served as a city council member in both Merced and Atwater and was a Member of the California State Assembly from 1996 to 2002. During his six years in the Assembly, he chaired the Rules Committee and helped found the Moderate Democratic Caucus.

Cardoza represented California's 18th Congressional District in the U.S. House of Representatives. The seat was previously held by Gary Condit. When Cardoza was starting out in politics, he served as Condit's Chief of Staff while Condit was still in the California Assembly. When Condit's career came under a cloud because of his extramarital affair with murdered intern Chandra Levy, Cardoza ran against him in the 2002 Democratic primary and won. Cardoza then faced Republican State Senator Dick Monteith in the November election. This race was considered to be the only potentially competitive House contest in California; redistricting after the 2000 census gave most of the state's 53 congresspersons safe districts. However, the Democratic-controlled state legislature had been concerned about a growing Republican trend in the 18th even before Condit's career imploded. The district and its predecessors had been in Democratic hands since 1955 and remained that way until the election of Republican John Duarte to Congress in 2022. The legislature shifted a Republican-leaning portion of eastern Stanislaus County to the heavily Republican 19th District. They replaced it with a mostly Democratic spur in and around Stockton, which gave the district a plurality of Latino voters. Cardoza defeated Monteith, 51 percent to 43 percent. He was reelected four times against only nominal opposition.

Cardoza was considered a conservative Democrat by California standards, which is typical for Democrats from the Central Valley. However, his voting record was slightly more liberal than that of Condit. During the 109th Congress, Cardoza was a co-chair of the Blue Dog Coalition, a group of moderate to conservative House Democrats of which Condit was a founding member. He was a member of the Resources Committee, Agriculture Committee, and International Relations Committee.

For the 112th Congress, Cardoza sat on the House Committee on Foreign Affairs, as well as the Agriculture Committee where he was ranking member of the Livestock, Dairy and Poultry Subcommittee. He remained a member of the Blue Dog Coalition, but his co-chairmanship was assumed by Congressman Mike Ross.

Media accounts suggest that Cardoza's decision to retire stemmed from the 2012 redistricting map, which put his hometown of Merced in the same district as fellow Blue Dog Jim Costa. Meanwhile, the reconfigured 10th, which includes much of Cardoza's old district, was won by Republican Jeff Denham.

Committee assignments
Committee on Agriculture
Subcommittee on General Farm Commodities and Risk Management
Subcommittee on Livestock, Dairy, and Poultry
Committee on Foreign Affairs
Subcommittee on Asia and the Pacific
Subcommittee on the Middle East and South Asia

Caucus memberships
Congressional Hispanic Caucus
International Conservation Caucus
Moderate Democratic Caucus
Sportsmen's Caucus

Honours
 Grand-Officer of the Order of Prince Henry, Portugal (8 June 2012)

References

External links
Dennis Cardoza Our Congressman official campaign site
 

|-

|-

|-

1959 births
21st-century American politicians
American people of Portuguese descent
California State University, Stanislaus alumni
Living people
Democratic Party members of the California State Assembly
Democratic Party members of the United States House of Representatives from California
People from Atwater, California
People from Merced, California
University of Maryland, College Park alumni
Members of Congress who became lobbyists